Yannick Noah defeated the defending champion Mats Wilander in the final, 6–2, 7–5, 7–6(7–3) to win the men's singles tennis title at the 1983 French Open. Noah remains the most recent Frenchman to win the title, and his victory also marked the last time a man won a singles major with a wooden racket.

Seeds
The seeded players are listed below. Yannick Noah is the champion; others show the round in which they were eliminated.

  Jimmy Connors (quarterfinals)
  John McEnroe (quarterfinals)
  Ivan Lendl (quarterfinals)
  Guillermo Vilas (quarterfinals)
  Mats Wilander (final)
  Yannick Noah (champion)
  José Luis Clerc (second round)
  José Higueras (semifinals)
  Vitas Gerulaitis (first round)
  Eliot Teltscher (fourth round)
  Jimmy Arias (fourth round)
  Brian Gottfried (fourth round)
  Wojtek Fibak (first round)
  Henrik Sundström (fourth round)
  Tomáš Šmíd (second round)
  Andrés Gómez (fourth round)

Draw

Finals

Top half

Section 1

Section 2

Section 3

Section 4

Bottom half

Section 5

Section 6

Section 7

Section 8

External links
 Association of Tennis Professionals (ATP) – 1983 French Open Men's Singles draw
1983 French Open – Men's draws and results at the International Tennis Federation

Men's Singles
French Open by year – Men's singles
1983 Grand Prix (tennis)